Mountain Song is a 2019 Indonesian drama film, directed and written by Yusuf Radjamuda in his feature-length directorial debut. The film stars Radjamuda's son, Alqusyairi Radjamuda as Gimba.

The film had its world premiere at the 2019 Shanghai International Film Festival. The film was nominated for three Citra Awards in 2020: Best Cinematography, Best Original Screenplay, and Best Actor (A. Radjamuda). At age 6, A. Radjamuda became the youngest Best Actor and acting nominee in history.

Premise
After the death of his father, Gimba sticks with his mother whose health is getting worse. They live in a remote village in the mountains of Pipikoro, South Sulawesi and has a difficult access to lowland. Then, his mother teaches Gimba a song which, is supposedly said, can bring tranquility and happiness. On their way, Gimba meets Lara, a mysterious girl his age.

Cast
Alqusyairi Radjamuda as Gimba
Laramputi Radjamuda
Ferdamayan
Sado Toringulu

Production
In an interview with Lokadata, Radjamuda revealed that the idea of Mountain Song was conceived based on the lives of people in Pipikoro, where the access to the lowland was difficult and some patients lost their lives during their way to the hospital in the city.

Release
Mountain Song had its world premiere at the 2019 Shanghai International Film Festival, where it won the Asian New Talent Award for Best Scriptwriter. The film was also screened at the 2019 World Cinema Amsterdam and 2020 Asian Film Festival in Rome, Italy.

Accolades

References

External links 

 

2019 directorial debut films
Indonesian drama films
2019 drama films